Mad Cowgirl is a low-budget film by Gregory Hatanaka released in 2006. Hatanaka dedicated the movie to Doris Wishman, who directed 1960s sexploitation films such as Diary of a Nudist, Behind the Nudist Curtain and Bad Girls Go to Hell, and actor John Cassavetes. Mad Cowgirl officially was selected to the SF Indiefest and the Silverlake Film Festival, followed by a limited release in major cities such as New York City and Seattle. Mad Cowgirl was released on DVD on December 5, 2006.

Plot
The central character in Mad Cowgirl is Therese, a meat inspector who is dying of a brain disorder. The film follows Therese on her surreal descent into violence, in which men in her life become the Ten Tigers of Canton that she must kill in order to become a better woman.

Victims of Therese's violent surreal madness include her meatpacking brother Thierry, naughty Pastor Dylan, and a Sri Lankan doctor.

Cast

 Sarah Lassez — Therese
 James Duval — Thierry
 Devon Odessa — Aimee
 Walter Koenig — Pastor Dylan
 Linton Semage — Dr. Suzuki
 Vic Chao — Charlie
 Christo DiMassis - Confessional Priest
 Douglas Dunning - Miles Graham
 Jaason Simmons - Jonathan Hunter
 Luke Y. Thompson - Big Brother Cheng
 Katie Weaver - Cindy
 Lucie Duval - Mother
 Willard Morgan - Paul, the producer
 Christopher Ogilvie - Leo
 Ron Becks - Pastor Johnson
 Jeff Milne - Willard

References

External links

Film Threat Review
Upstage Magazine Review
The New York Times Review

2006 films
2000s exploitation films
Films shot in Los Angeles
2000s serial killer films
2000s English-language films
Films directed by Gregory Hatanaka
American exploitation films
2000s American films